The  is a railway line operated by the private railway operator Odakyu Electric Railway in the Greater Tokyo of Japan. The line extends  from Shin-Yurigaoka Station in Kanagawa Prefecture to Karakida Station in Tokyo.

Used for commuter service by the residents of Tama New Town, the largest New Town in Japan, rapid trains are frequent on the line, through to Odakyu's Tokyo terminus at Shinjuku on the Odakyu Odawara Line) or via the Tokyo Metro Chiyoda Line subway with connections onward to the Joban Line. Tama Express trains terminate at Toride Station in Toride, Ibaraki, on the opposite side of Tokyo.

Service patterns
 
Up to Shinjuku or Ayase on the Tokyo Metro Chiyoda Line. One exception is down from Shin-Yurigaoka. Weekday mornings only.
 
Mostly in the line only, and some from/to Shinjuku, all day long.

Former Service
 
All from/to Toride on East Japan Railway Company (JR East) Joban Line via the Chiyoda Line. All day.

Stations
 Local and Section Semi Express services stop at all stations.

History

This line was built as a part of Tokyo Line 9, linked with the Tokyo Metro Chiyoda Line and Odakyu Odawara Line.

Odakyu started service on the first section, from Shin-Yurigaoka to Odakyū-Nagayama, on June 1, 1974. It expanded to Tama Center, the central station of Tama New Town, on April 23, 1975. This section was constructed by the national Japan Railway Construction Corporation, since renamed the Japan Railway Construction, Transport and Technology Agency (JRTT), while Odakyu operated it and paid for the organization. On March 27, 1990, Odakyu opened Karakida station.

The line was constructed as double track, but Odakyu could not take a large part of the transport between Tokyo and Tama New Town. Delay to the quadrupling of the main Odawara Line due to long standing land acquisition conflicts prevented operating extra trains that were to connect the new town and the terminus of Shinjuku.

Rapid train services on the Tama Line began in 2000, and succeeded in increasing the number of passengers, shorting transit time.

References
This article incorporates material from the corresponding article in the Japanese Wikipedia.

Lines of Odakyu Electric Railway
Railway lines in Kanagawa Prefecture
Railway lines in Tokyo
1067 mm gauge railways in Japan
Railway lines opened in 1974
1974 establishments in Japan